Blood, Sweat and Tears is the fifteenth album by singer Johnny Cash, released on January 7, 1963. It is a collection of songs about the American working man. This includes "The Legend of John Henry's Hammer" and "Busted", the latter of which would become a single. Both would also be performed by Cash during his famous 1968 concerts at Folsom Prison and be included in the 1999 extended reissue of the album, At Folsom Prison. The album was included on the Bear Family Records box set Come Along and Ride This Train.

Track listing

Personnel
 Johnny Cash - vocals, rhythm guitar
 The Carter Family - backing vocals
 Luther Perkins - lead guitar
 Bob Johnson - guitar, banjo
 Marshall Grant - bass
 W.S. Holland - drums
 Maybelle Carter - autoharp
 Bill Pursell - piano
Additional personnel 
 Frank Jones - Producer
 Don Law - Producer
 Vic Anesini - Mastering (CD Reissue)
 Frank Bez - Photography

Charts
Album - Billboard (United States)

Singles - Billboard (United States)

External links
 LP Discography entry on Blood, Sweat and Tears

Blood Sweat and Tears (album)
Blood Sweat and Tears (album)
Blood Sweat and Tears (album)
Blood Sweat and Tears (album)
Legacy Recordings albums